Undercover Billionaire is an American reality television series that is broadcast on the Discovery Channel. The show premiered on August 6, 2019 and the final episode of the first season aired September 24, 2019. The show follows billionaire Glenn Stearns, founder of Stearns Lending, as he attempts to start a million-dollar business in Erie, Pennsylvania over the course of 90 days, starting with only $100, a car and a tank of gas.

The series follows Stearns as he identifies his target business, puts a crew together to help him, builds his initial $100 stake sufficiently to fund a startup company, and opens a barbecue restaurant named Underdog BBQ. The presence of a Discovery Channel film crew was explained by saying that they were trailing him for a documentary about building a small business from scratch.

A TV special titled Undercover Billionaire: Return To Erie premiered on August 18, 2020.

A second season premiered on January 6, 2021. Season 2 features three self-styled successful entrepreneurs (Grant Cardone, Monique Idlett-Mosley and Elaine Culotti) who go undercover in three different cities and attempt to start a business with a "valuation of $1 million dollars" in 90 days- the same challenge that Glenn Stearns competed. A continuation of Glenn Stearns' work in Erie, called Undercover Billionaire: Comeback City also aired in alongside Season 2 and debuted in its entirety on Discovery Plus

Episodes

Series overview

Season 1 (2019)

Special (2020)

Season 2 (2021)

References

External links
 Official website

2019 American television series debuts
Discovery Channel original programming
Films shot in Erie, Pennsylvania